Gow is a Scottish surname. The name is derived from the Gaelic gobha, meaning 'smith'. The name is represented in Scottish Gaelic as Gobha.

People
 A. S. F. Gow, classical scholar
 Alan Gow, Scottish footballer
 Alan J. Gow, Australian motorsport executive, Director of the British Touring Car Championship
Alexander J. Gow, Aria Award Winning Australian Songwriter (Oh Mercy)
Andrew Gow, historian
Elle Macpherson, Australian model (born Eleanor Gow)
 Gerry Gow (born 1952), Scottish footballer
 Ian Gow, British politician assassinated by the IRA
 James Gow (1862-1942), New Zealand politician
 Jennie Gow (born 1977), British broadcaster
 John Gow (c.1698-1725), Scottish pirate
 John Gow (footballer, born 1859), Scottish footballer
 John Gow (footballer, born 1869), Scottish footballer
 John Gow, Canadian para-alpine skier
 John Graham Gow (1850-1917), New Zealand commercial traveller and trade representative
 Leonard Gow (1859-1936), Scottish art collector and philanthropist
 Michael Gow, Australian playwright
 Michael Gow (British Army officer), former Scottish soldier, commanding general and ADC to the Queen
 Nathaniel Gow, composer and son of Niel Gow
 Niel Gow, Scottish fiddler and composer
 Peter Gow (politician), Canadian businessman and politician
 Peter Gow (anthropologist), Scottish social anthropologist
 Ronald Gow, English dramatist
 Stevie Gow, Scottish footballer

Phamie Gow, Scottish composer and musician

See also
 Gow (sept)
 Gow (disambiguation)

References

Anglicised Scottish Gaelic-language surnames